One Ten Hundred Thousand Million is the second studio album by electronic band The Octopus Project. It was released January 25, 2005 on Peek-A-Boo Records.

Track listing
 "Exit Counselor" – 1:32
 "The Adjustor" – 2:53
 "All of the Champs That Ever Lived" – 4:11
 "Bruise" – 3:10
 "Responsible Stu" – 3:40
 "Music Is Happiness" – 3:39
 "Tuxedo Hat" – 5:13
 "Malaria Codes" – 3:44
 "Hold the Ladder" – 3:36
 "Six Feet Up" – 3:53
 "Lots More Stairs" – 2:55

Notes
 "Music is Happiness" has featured in Tony Hawk's Proving Ground and has a music video. It also appears on the soundtrack for the movie 21.

References

External links
 CD version site at Peek-A-Boo Records
 LP version site at Peek-A-Boo Records

2005 albums
The Octopus Project albums
Peek-A-Boo Records albums